The 1972 season was the Hawthorn Football Club's 48th season in the Victorian Football League and 71st overall. Hawthorn entered the season as the defending VFL Premiers.

Fixture

Premiership season

Ladder

References

Hawthorn Football Club seasons